Oberstown Children Detention Campus is a youth detention centre located in the north part of County Dublin (Fingal), Ireland. It houses both male and female offenders.

History

Trinity House Reformatory School, a high-security institution, was opened in 1983. Oberstown Boys School and Oberstown Girls School opened in 1991. The three schools merged in 2016.

In 2016, a riot led to a major fire and the deployment of armed gardaí.

In 2017, two offenders escaped after attacking a staff member with a crowbar. They were quickly recaptured.

In May 2020, "Boy A", one of the murderers of Ana Kriegel, was assaulted by other residents.

Facilities

The deputy director describes it as "not a prison" and that residents are not prisoners, but "young people in conflict with the law." Their model of care is built around "care, education, health, offending behaviour, and preparation for leaving." There are two separate schools, Oberstown Boys School and Oberstown Girls School, operating under the patronage of Dublin & Dún Laoghaire Education and Training Board.

About one-fifth of residents are Irish Travellers, while 71% have substance misuse issues.

After release, residents return to their families or are placed in the care of the Child and Family Agency.

Notable residents
Due to laws protecting juvenile offenders, residents can in general not be publicly named.

"Boy A" and "Boy B", teenage murderers of Ana Kriégel
The murderer of Lorcan O'Reilly
Stephen Egan, murderer of Gary Douch

See also
 Prisons in Ireland

Notes

Prisons in the Republic of Ireland
Youth detention centers
Buildings and structures in Fingal